Tatars are one of many ethnic minorities in Ukraine. In Ukraine the Tatar national identification is used primarily for such Turkic group as Volga Tatars, less often Siberian Tatars.

Location and number 
In Ukraine, the number of Tatars is estimated at over 73,000 (the 2001 Ukrainian Census) Tatars in Ukraine lived since the princely times. One of its representatives khan Tugorkhan lived at the Trukhaniv Island until his assassination in 1096.

References

Ethnic groups in Ukraine